Byron Williams may refer to:

 Byron Williams (American football) (born 1960), former American football wide receiver
 Byron Williams (fictional character), a fictional character in the 1996 film Mars Attacks!
 Byron Williams (shooter) (born 1965), American responsible for the 2010 shootout with California Highway Patrol officers in Oakland, California
 Byron Williams, who died in police custody in Las Vegas in 2019 after telling officers "I can't breathe"